Boostedt-Rickling is an Amt ("collective municipality") in the district of Segeberg, in Schleswig-Holstein, Germany. The seat of the Amt is in Boostedt. Before 1 January 2008, when Boostedt joined, the Amt was named Rickling, and the municipality Rickling was its seat.

The Amt Boostedt-Rickling consists of the following municipalities:

Boostedt 
Daldorf 
Groß Kummerfeld 
Heidmühlen 
Latendorf 
Rickling

References

Ämter in Schleswig-Holstein
Segeberg